Alessandro Zattoni is Full Professor of Strategy at the Department of Business and Management of the LUISS Business School, Rome, Italy.

Career
He has been Full Professor of Management at Parthenope University of Naples, Italy, and (Full) Professor of Corporate Governance at Bocconi University, where he has also been Director of the Strategic and Entrepreneurial Management Department and he is currently Director of the Executive Education Open Program Division of SDA Bocconi School of Management. 

He has been joint Editor-in-Chief of Corporate Governance: An International Review as well as a member of the Editorial Review Board of the Journal of Management Studies and the Journal of Management and Governance.

Voluntary activities
Zattoni is organiser of the EURAM Early Career Colloquium 2018, where he and other well-renowned mentors provide help to inexperienced early career researchers.

As of 2022, Zattoni has been President of the European Academy of Management.

Recent publications
 Zattoni, A. et al. (2017) Does board independence influence financial performance in IPO firms? The moderating role of the national business system, Journal of World Business.
 Kumar P. and Zattoni A. (2017) Advancing the Literature on Ownership Structure and Corporate Governance, Corporate Governance. An International Review.

References

External links
Alessandro Zattoni Bocconi webpage
Alessandro Zattoni CV

Living people
Year of birth missing (living people)
Academic staff of the Parthenope University of Naples
Academic staff of Bocconi University